Paphiopedilum subgenus Polyantha is a subgenus of the genus Paphiopedilum. Species in this section have more than one flower per inflorescence.

Distribution
Plants from this section are found from western China down to Philippines, Malaysia, Indonesia, and Papua New Guinea.

Species
Paphiopedilum subgenus Polyantha comprises the following species:

References

Orchid subgenera